The Bala language is a possibly extinct Southern Tungusic language that was spoken in and around the Zhangguangcai Mountains 张广才岭 of Heilongjiang Province, Northeastern China. No standard orthography exists for the language, although manuscripts have occasionally recorded Bala words using Chinese characters.

Classification
Bala clearly belongs to the Jurchenic language subgroup of Southern Tungusic languages, but its exact position within Jurchenic remains to be determined. Bala is more closely related to Jurchen than it is to Manchu and retains many archaic features. It reportedly became extinct in 1982, but it is unknown whether there could be rememberers of the language still alive today.

In addition to influences from Northeastern Mandarin and Manchu, Bala may also have been influenced by Southern Nanai languages such as Kilen.

Distribution
Originally spoken by mountain dwellers who claimed to have fled to the Zhangguangcai Mountains to flee from the late 16th-century Manchu campaigns of Nurhaci, Bala speakers later scattered into the plains to the west and south of the mountain range, with some speakers also moving to various villages in northern Jilin Province. Bala villages in Heilongjiang and Jilin provinces include Acheng 阿城, Bayan 巴彦, Binxian 宾县, Fangzheng 方正, Hulan 呼兰, Mulan 木兰, Shangzhi 尚志, Shuangcheng 双城, Tonghe 通河, Wuchang 五常, and Yanshou 延寿, Emu 额穆, Guandi 官地, Yushu 榆树, and Jiaohe 蛟河.

Documentation
The Bala language has been documented by Mu Yejun 穆晔骏 (also known as Mu'ercha Yejun 穆尔察晔骏, or Mu'ercha Anbulonga 穆尔察安布隆阿; 1926‒1989). Additional linguistic data has also been collected by Li Keman and her father Li Guojun.

References

Agglutinative languages
Tungusic languages
Extinct languages of Asia
Languages of China